Pelvic spurs are the externally visible portion of the vestigial remnants of legs found on each side of the cloaca in primitive snakes, such as boas and pythons. The remnants of a pelvis and femur, which have no connection with the spine, simply "float" in the muscle mass. The femur protrudes from the snake's body and is covered by a horny structure, which resembles a spur or claw. Males' spurs are generally longer and more pointed than females', and are used for clasping and tickling during courtship and mating, as well as combat with other males in some species.

These spurs represent a sexually dimorphic feature, and for some species, spurs can reliably be used to identify the sex of a snake.

References

Snake anatomy